Ezequiel Héctor Viola (born 1 September 1987) is an Argentine professional footballer who plays as a goalkeeper for Club Atlético Sansinena Social y Deportivo.

Career
Olimpo gave Viola his start in professional football, selecting him in matches against All Boys and Los Andes during the 2008–09 Primera B Nacional. Olimpo won promotion to the Primera División in the following season, remaining for two seasons but he didn't feature in any games; though was on the substitutes bench fifteen times in 2011–12. On 3 June 2013, Viola was loaned to Torneo Argentino A's Juventud Antoniana. Eighteen appearances subsequently occurred. Viola returned to Olimpo in mid-2014 with the club back in tier one, going on to make his top-flight bow versus Sarmiento in September.

In July 2016, Viola joined Torneo Federal A side Gimnasia y Esgrima. He featured fifty-four times across two league campaigns, participating in twenty-one fixtures in 2017–18 as they were promoted to Primera B Nacional. Ahead of 2018–19, Viola rejoined Olimpo. His first match back was a home loss to Sarmiento on 26 August.

Career statistics
.

References

External links

1987 births
Living people
Sportspeople from Bahía Blanca
Argentine footballers
Association football goalkeepers
Primera Nacional players
Torneo Argentino A players
Argentine Primera División players
Torneo Federal A players
Olimpo footballers
Juventud Antoniana footballers
Gimnasia y Esgrima de Mendoza footballers
Club Atlético Sansinena Social y Deportivo players